The 2021–22 Jackson State Lady Tigers basketball team represented Jackson State University during the 2021–22 NCAA Division I women's basketball season. The Tigers, led by fourth year head coach Tomekia Reed, played their home games at the Williams Assembly Center and were members of the Southwestern Athletic Conference (SWAC). 

They finished the season 23–7, 18–0 in SWAC play to win the regular season title. As the first seed in the SWAC tournament they defeated Mississippi Valley State in the Quarterfinals, Grambling State in the Semifinal and Alabama State in the Final to win the tournament title.  They received an automatic bid to the NCAA tournament and were the fourteen seed in the Spokane Regional. They were defeated in the First Round by LSU to end their season.

Previous season 
The Tigers finished the regular season 18–6, 14–1 in SWAC play to win the regular season championship. As the first seed in the SWAC tournament they defeated Arkansas-Pine Bluff in the Quarterfinals, Southern in the Semifinal and Alabama State in the Final to win their second consecutive championship.  They received an automatic bid to the NCAA tournament and were the fifteen seed in the River Walk Regional. They were defeated in the First Round by Baylor to end their season.

Roster

Schedule
Source:

|-
!colspan=6 style=| Non-conference regular season

|-
!colspan=6 style=| SWAC Regular Season

|-
!colspan=6 style=| SWAC Tournament

|-
!colspan=6 style=| NCAA tournament

Rankings

The Coaches Poll did not release a Week 2 poll and the AP Poll did not release a poll after the NCAA Tournament.

References

Jackson State Lady Tigers basketball seasons
Jackson State
Jackson State, basketball women
Jackson State, basketball women
Jackson State